Templar Saxe (born Templer William Edward Edevein; August 22, 1865 – April 17, 1935) was a British-born stage actor, opera singer and silent film actor. In films, he usually was a character actor as his singing voice could not be used in silent films. He was born in Redhill, Surrey, England and died in Cincinnati, Ohio.

Life and career
Templar Saxe was the son of Lady de Capel Broke and Eaton Edeveain, a prominent London barrister and journalist. He originally planned to join the diplomatic service, but chose performing instead.

Theatre
In 1901, he starred in Alfred E. Aarons' production of The Ladies' Paradise at the Metropolitan Opera House in New York City. In 1905, he starred in the Broadway production of The Earl and the Girl at the Casino Theatre, and was praised by The New York Times for his singing.

Film
In 1919, he starred in The Teeth of the Tiger. In 1927, he starred in When a Man Loves.

Selected filmography 
Beauty Unadorned (1913)
A Lily in Bohemia (1915)
The Starring of Flora Finchurch (1915)
Myrtle the Manicurist (1916)
The Tarantula (1916)
Intrigue (1917)
The Sixteenth Wife (1917)
Mary Jane's Pa (1917)
The Fettered Woman (1917)
Babette (1917)
Womanhood, the Glory of the Nation (1917)
The Triumph of the Weak (1918)
The Lion and the Mouse (1919)
The Teeth of the Tiger (1919)
Human Desire (1919)
The Mind the Paint Girl (1919)
The Dangerous Paradise (1920)
Slaves of Pride (1920)
 Whispers (1920)
Two Weeks (1920)
Bucking the Tiger (1921)
How Women Love (1922)
 What Fools Men Are (1922)
In Search of a Thrill (1923)
Sidewalks of New York (1923)
Beau Brummel (1924)
Captain Blood (1924)
Her Night of Romance (1924)
Gerald Cranston's Lady (1924)
What Price Beauty? (1925)
The Primrose Path (1925)
Time, the Comedian (1925)
The Dancers (1925)
The White Black Sheep (1926)
When a Man Loves (1927)
The Girl from Gay Paree (1927)
 For Ladies Only (1927)
Beyond London Lights (1928)

References

External links 

1865 births
1935 deaths
People from Redhill, Surrey
English opera singers
English male stage actors
English male film actors
English male silent film actors
20th-century English male actors
English expatriates in the United States